The Myles N. Kenyon Cup, popularly known as the Kenyon Cup was an amateur football cup competition held for teams playing in Amateur Leagues in and around Bury, England and is named after former Lancashire captain and batsman and High Sheriff of Lancashire, Myles Noel Kenyon. It was formed in 1922 and the last game was played in 2017.

History
The first recorded Kenyon Cup competition took place in 1922 taking its constituent teams from the four local leagues:
 The Bury Amateur Football League
 The Bury Metro Alliance Amateur Football League
 The Radcliffe Amateur Football League
 The Bury & District Sunday Schools' Amateur Football League

Since its inception the competition has been runs as a benevolent fund for either players or match officials who have suffered financial hardship due to their involvement in football or for other causes. This can be shown amongst other things by the cup being run as a joint committee of the four original leagues and the Referees' Association. The full title was 'Bury and District Football Leagues' and Referees' Association Central Benevolent Fund.'

The original cup was stolen recently and was described as

"an 8in hallmarked silver cup, with handles and scalloped top to bown of cup. It had a double riser plinth with two complete name bands. It was engraved, "Bury & District Football Leagues Benevolent Fund, The Myles N. Kenyon Cup." It weighed 25oz."

The cup was an annual competition for a variety of leagues across Bury until in recent times all bar the Bury Amateur League pulled out of the competition as the leagues folded.

Finally in 2004 the Bury Amateur League could no longer hold a full fixture list having only three clubs remaining, and so as the only remaining constituent league withdrew, the Cup  was suspended indefinitely.

Relaunch
In 2005, the Management Committee, consisting of the Life Members, Officers, representatives of the Bury Referees' Association and other committee members relaunched the cup as a preseason competition and once again invited teams from a number of different leagues across Bury to join the cup.

Since the relaunch of the competition the cup continued as a preseason tournament with the final held each year on Bury's Gigg Lane. In earlier seasons' competition the semi finals was held at a neutral venue (Ramsbottom United's Riverside Ground). In the second year of the new competition a group stage was added for the first round, with four groups of four, the top two teams progressing on to the quarter final stages.

For most seasons since 2005, 16 teams participated, although by 2016-17 this dropped to 8 teams. It had also become increasingly difficult for the committee to recruit volunteers to serve as officers or committee members. As a result, the decision was taken in early 2017 that the competition would be permanently discontinued after the final Final tie on 24 April 2017. The historic Spencer Cup had been presented to the Mayor of Bury, for safekeeping by the Metropolitan Borough of Bury, on Thursday 20 April 2017.

Recent Previous Finals

Note that while some teams are referred to as "A" or "B", this is not in reference to the clubs' 3rd or 4th teams as would generally be the case. Similar to how the Bury Amateur League used to document the teams, where a club has 2 teams entering the competition, the 1st team would be known as "A", and the reserves "B".

References

External links
 Official Website
 Bury Referees' Association Website

Football cup competitions in England